Haris Pašović (born 16 July 1961) is a Bosnian theatre director. Over the course of his career, he has also worked as a playwright, producer, choreographer, performer, and designer. He is best known for his productions of Wedekind's “Spring Awakening”. He is the artistic leader of the East West Theatre Company in Sarajevo and tenured Professor of Directing at the Academy of Performing Arts in Sarajevo.

Life and career
Pašović was born in Sarajevo, Bosnia and Herzegovina in 1961. His education includes the Academy of Performing Arts in Novi Sad, former Yugoslavia; the Fulbright Scholarship in the USA (University of Hawaii, Honolulu, New York University and the University of Wisconsin, Madison); the UNESCO High Levels for Directors, Festival d’Avignon, France, and other professional trainings.

He directed in some of the most significant theatres in the former Yugoslavia and participated in a number of festivals worldwide. His productions of Frank Wedekind's Spring Awakening and Calling the Birds based on Aristophanes’ play The Birds (both at the Yugoslav Drama Theatre, Belgrade 1987/90) have been considered as the landmarks in the theatre of the former Yugoslavia.  Likewise, Samuel Beckett's Waiting for Godot (Belgrade Drama Theatre) and Alfred Jarry’s Ubu Roi  (National Theatre Subotica) have been considered as the classic productions in the ex-Yugoslav theatre, the former being the last Yugoslav premiere performed on the eve of the war in the country.  As the artistic leader of theatre Promena (“Change”), Pašović directed with a great success Wiess's Marat/Sade; Wedensky's The Christmas Three at the Ivanovs; Kis's Simon the Magus on a lake surrounded by sand desert; Buñuel's Hamlet placed in the fortress sitting on a rock rising from the Adriatic Sea (Dubrovnik Summer Festival) and many other plays.

During the siege of Sarajevo (1992–96) Pašović spent most of the time in Sarajevo managing the MES International Theatre Festival. He directed plays and produced several shows, among others Waiting for Godot, directed by Susan Sontag.<ref name="www.nytimes.com">[https://www.nytimes.com/1993/08/19/world/to-sarajevo-writer-brings-good-will-and-godot.html?scp=4&sq=haris%20pasovic&st=cse/ New York Times (19 August 1993): To Sarajevo, Writer Brings Good Will and 'Godot''' by John F. Burns]</ref> In 1993, while Sarajevo was still under the siege, he also organized the first Sarajevo Film Festival “Beyond the End of the World” and was one of the most prominent advocates of naming a square in Sarajevo after Susan Sontag.Bled School of Management Pašović even managed  to tour in 1994 to several European countries (under UNESCO auspices) with the Sarajevo Festival Ensemble invited by Peter Brook and Théâtre des Bouffes du Nord. During the tour, the Ensemble performed two productions he had directed in the besieged city: Silk Drums based on the Noh plays, and In the Country of Last Things, based on Paul Auster's novel.

After the war, Pašović directed several documentaries including Greta, a story on Prof. Greta Ferusic who survived both Auschwitz and the siege of Sarajevo; a documentary trilogy entitled Home, Love Thy Neighbor and The Balkans – Blood and Honey about the American journalists David Rieff, Peter Maass and Ron Haviv, who had reported from the Bosnian War and an art documentary entitled A Propos de Sarajevo about the Sarajevo International Jazz Festival.

In 2002, Pašović made a spectacular comeback to theatre directing Shakespeare's “Romeo and Juliet” in front of the Parliament of Bosnia and Herzegovina in a downtown Sarajevo. This was a brave futuristic production about a Muslim Romeo and a Christian Juliet, which involved 25 actors and live musicians, 1000 sq. m of stage, a 60-member crew, arms, vehicles, fireworks, video projections across the façade of the Parliament building and has stopped the traffic in the main city artery for four hours each night it was performed.

In 2005, Pašović established the East West Theatre Company and directed a number of shows. Pašović also writes the plays. He wrote Rebellion at the National Theatre, Ulysses, Silk Drums, Bolero, Sarajevo and Football, Football. He also adapted several texts including Alfred Jarry’s Ubu Roi, Aristophanes' The Birds, Miroslav Krleža's Europe Today, Nigel Williams' Class EnemySCOTSMAN: Brave art - Haris Pašović's Class Enemy ” and several others. He writes essays and articles.

Pašović gave a number of workshops and master-classes for directors and actors, as well as public lectures (Tyrone Guthrie Centre; National Theatre of Scotland/Edinburgh International Festival; Queen's University, Belfast; Drama Centre Singapore; Festival Desire Subotica, Serbia, etc.).

He is a co-founder of the Directing Department at the Performing Arts Academy in Sarajevo. Several of his students are today internationally acclaimed film directors (such as Academy Award-winning Danis Tanović and Golden Bear-winning Jasmila Žbanić). Pašović lives in Sarajevo. He teaches Directing at Academy of Performing Arts in Sarajevo and Arts and Leadership at the Bled School of Management, Slovenia.

Haris Pašović is the main initiator of a large-scale event called Sarajevo Red Line which in April 2012 commemorated the Siege of Sarajevo's 20th anniversary. This drama and music poem dedicated to Sarajevo citizens killed during the 1992–96 Bosnian War consisted of 11,541 red chairs placed on the main Sarajevo street and it included a street exhibition and a concert. The event received a big international coverage in the media and was broadcast live in a number of TV stations.Balkaninsight.com: Sarajevo to Mark 20 Years Since Siege Started by Elvira Jukić - In English[cited 9 April 2012]

Works
 Buñuel's Hamlet, 1984
 Marat/Sad, TV drama, TV Novi Sad (adapted and directed by), 1985
 Paradise, now!, TV drama, TV Novi Sad (screenplay adaptation and directed by), 1985
 Frank Wedekind's Spring’s Awakening, 1987
 Calling the Birds (based on Aristophanes’ play “The Birds”), 1989
 Samuel Beckett's Waiting for Godot Ubu Roi  (based on Alfred Jarry's play)
 Wiess’ Marat/Sade Wedensky's The Christmas Three at the Ivanovs’ Kis’ Simon the Magus Silk Drums (based on the Noh plays), 1994
 In the Country of Last Things (based on Paul Auster's novel), 1994
 Greta ”, feature documentary (director and producer), 1997
 Iz Albanije, documentary (screenwriter and director), 1998
 Home, a documentary trilogy, 1999/2000
 Love Thy Neighbor, a documentary trilogy, 1999/2000
 The Balkans – Blood and Honey, a documentary trilogy , 1999/2000
 Shakespeare’s Romeo and Juliet, 2002
 À propos de Sarajevo,  documentary (screenwriter, director and producer), 2003
 Rebellion at the National Theatre (inspired by McCoy’s novel “They Shoot the Horses, Don’t They?”), playwright and director, 2004
 Ulysses (playwright)
 Bolero, Sarajevo
 Hamlet by William Shakespeare (director), 2005
 Victor or the Children Take Over, 2006
 Faust (adapted and directed by), 2006
 Class Enemy based on Nigel Williams’ play (adapted and directed by), 2008
 Nora (Henrik Ibsen's Doll's House), 2009
 Football, Football, 2010
 Europe Today'', 2011
 Sarajevo Red Line, 2012
 The Conquest of Happiness, new work theatre production, 2013

Awards
 BITEF award for the Best Director
 ‘’Bojan Stupica’’ award for Best Director in the former Yugoslavia
 Best Director Award at the MES International Theatre Festival
 UCHIMURA Prize
 The Best Director at the Festival of Bosnian Theatres

External links

References

1961 births
Living people
Bosniaks of Bosnia and Herzegovina
Bosnia and Herzegovina film directors
Bosnia and Herzegovina documentary film directors
Bosnia and Herzegovina theatre directors
Theatre people from Sarajevo